Władysław Sebyła (1902–1940) was a Polish poet, a member of the Kwadryga (Four-in-Hand) literary group, which also included Konstanty Ildefons Gałczyński and Stefan Flukowski. He was executed in Kharkiv.

Selected works
Poetry collections: "Modlitwa" ("Prayer"), "Pieśni Szczurołapa" ("The songs of Rat-catcher"), "Koncert Egotyczny" ("Egotic Concert").

References

1902 births
1940 deaths
Katyn massacre victims
Polish deportees to Soviet Union
20th-century Polish poets